Columbus County is a county located in the U.S. state of North Carolina, on its southeastern border.  Its county seat is Whiteville. The 2020 census showed a loss of 12.9% of the population from that of 2010. As of the 2020 census, the population is 50,623. This included inmate prison population of approximately 2500.

History

Early history
The area comprising Columbus County was originally inhabited by the Waccamaw people. Historically, the "eastern Siouans" had territories extending through the area of Columbus County prior to any European exploration or settlement in the 16th century.

English colonial settlement in what was known as Carolina did not increase until the late 17th and early 18th centuries. Following epidemics of new infectious diseases, to which indigenous peoples were exposed in trading and other contact, the Waccamaw and other Native Americans often suffered disruption and fatalities when caught between larger tribes and colonists in the  Tuscarora and Yamasee wars. Afterward most of the Tuscarora people migrated north, joining other Iroquoian-speaking peoples of the Five Nations of the Iroquois Confederacy in New York State by 1722. At that point the leaders declared their migration ended and the tribe officially relocated to that area.

The Waccamaw Siouan ancestors retreated for safety to an area of Green Swamp near Lake Waccamaw. Throughout the 19th century, the Waccamaw Siouan were seldom mentioned in the historical record. If descendants intermarried with whites and/or African Americans, their children were assumed to lose their Indian status, although they were often reared in Indian culture. Since North Carolina was a slave society, whites classified anyone with visible African features as slaves and blacks first.

Colonial settlement
As America was colonized by the British, the area encompassing Columbus County was first organized part of the Bath Precinct of North Carolina, established by the British Crown in 1696. In 1729 a southern portion was split off by the General Assembly to create New Hanover County, and five years later Bladen was formed out of part of New Hanover. In 1764 Brunswick County was formed out of Bladen and New Hanover. Throughout this time the area was largely forested and had few white settlers, though the General Assembly established two roads through the area in 1764. William Bartram, a botanist from Pennsylvania, journeyed to Lake Waccamaw to study the flora and fauna of the region in the 1730s, creating the first detailed written account of the area. At least two skirmishes of the American Revolutionary War were fought on Columbus soil: one near Pireway and another at Brown Marsh.

Creation 
Columbus County was created by the General Assembly on December 15, 1808, to make it easier for local residents to conduct official business without having to travel to the seat of Brunswick County. Columbus was formed from parts of Bladen and Brunswick counties and named in honor of Christopher Columbus. The county's borders were modified several times by legislative act between 1809 and 1821. In 1810, a community was platted on land owned by James B. White for the purpose of creating a county seat. It was originally known as White's Crossing before being incorporated as Whiteville in 1832. The first courthouse and jail, made of wood, were built there in 1809.

Development 

At the time of its creation, Columbus County was sparsely populated. A new brick courthouse and jail were erected in 1852. The construction of a railroad along the Bladen-Columbus border in the 1860s spurred growth. The laying of the Wilmington, Columbia and Augusta Railroad later in the decade connected Whiteville with Wilmington and supported the development of strong lumber and naval stores industries. The county also produced corn, wheat, cotton, and wool.

Most white men in the county fought during the American Civil War, while most free blacks and mulattoes were exempted from service. The county was spared direct fighting, but the war demands stressed the local labor and food markets, and severe rains in 1863 diminished grain yields. Most residents resorted to trade via the barter system. After Wilmington fell to Union troops in February 1865, Union marauders sacked Whiteville. After the war Columbus' economy grew more heavily reliant on corn and cotton production. In 1877 part of Brunswick County was annexed to Columbus.

In the post-Reconstruction period, after white Democrats regained dominance in politics, they emphasized white supremacy and classified all non-whites as black. For instance, Native Americans could not attend schools for white children. Toward the end of the century, the U.S. Census recorded common Waccamaw surnames among individuals in the small isolated communities of this area.

Tobacco was introduced as a crop in Columbus in 1896, and that year a tobacco warehouse was established in Fair Bluff. It remained a marginal crop until 1914, and at the conclusion of World War I overtook cotton as the county's major cash crop. The county's first bank was opened in 1903. Strawberries were introduced at Chadbourn in 1895, and by 1907 Chadbourn had become one of the leading strawberry producers in the world. Another courthouse and jail were built in 1914.

Ku Klux Klan 
In 1950 Thomas Hamilton, a South Carolina leader of a white supremacist Ku Klux Klan chapter, began a recruiting campaign to expand his organization's reach into Columbus County, focusing on the towns of Chadbourn, Fair Bluff, Tabor City, and Whiteville. In late July they paraded through Tabor City, passing out handbills which exhorted white men to join them in resisting "Jews, nigger, and integrationist quacks". W. Horace Carter, the publisher of the Tabor City Tribune, issued an editorial the following day denouncing the Klan as a violent group and urging local residents to ignore them, leading to a threatening note being placed on his car the following day. The county hosted many Klan sympathizers and a Klavern was organized later that year in Whiteville. The News Reporter of Whiteville, led by editor Willard Cole, joined the Tabor City Tribune in reporting on Klan activities and denouncing the organization, leading to threats against Cole.

The following January the Klansmen began night raids on homes, abducting and flogging residents who they felt had violated traditional mores. Over the following months the Klan continued to conduct raids, heightening local tensions. In early October 1951 Klansmen from Fair Bluff abducted a couple and transported them into South Carolina. Abduction crossing state lines was a federal crime, and as a result the U.S. Federal Bureau of Investigation (FBI) became involved. In February 1952 the FBI, state agents, and county sheriff's deputies initiated a crackdown and arrested 11 Klansmen responsible for the October abduction. Law enforcement made additional arrests over subsequent months. Of the near 100 Klansmen arrested, 63 including Hamilton were convicted of various crimes. For their efforts against the Klan, in 1953 the Tabor City Tribune and The News Reporter won the Pulitzer Prize for Public Service.

Colcor

By the early 1980s, Columbus County had a reputation for intense political competition marked by accusations of fraud and impropriety. The FBI had received several complaints from local police officers and residents about alleged protection rackets run by public officials and election fraud. In early 1980 a former FBI informant moved to the county and reported that he was being told to pay bribes to ensure the smooth operation of his business. Taking into account the previous complains they had received, upon being informed the FBI initiated an undercover investigation into corruption in Columbus County, codenamed "Colcor".

FBI agents posed as corrupt businessmen with connections to the Detroit Mafia. They set up an illegal gambling club in Lake Waccamaw to make connections with locals and paid bribes to a local judge and the town's police chief to protect their operation. The agents also paid bribes to county commission chairman Ed Walton Williamson in exchange for political influence. With Williamson's help, the agents devised a scheme to investigate election fraud by instigating a referendum in the town of Bolton to legalize liquor-by-the-drink and supplying a local political leader with funds to buy votes to achieve their desired outcome, the first time the FBI had ever tried to manipulate a public election. The town ultimately voted in favor of legalizing liquor-by-the-drink. The agents were also asked by State Representative G. Ronald Taylor to burn down a business competitor's property, though Taylor eventually enlisted other men to commit the arson.

The FBI publicly revealed the Colcor operation on July 29, 1982. A total of 40 people were indicted for crimes observed during the course of the investigation. Of those indicted, 38 were convicted of crimes, with many reaching plea bargains with prosecutors. The U.S. House of Representatives and the North Carolina State Board of Elections were critical of the FBI's involvement in the vote-buying sting surrounding the liquor referendum in Bolton, with the Board of Elections ultimately nullifying the referendum.

Economic stagnation 
The manufacturing sector in Columbus County began a decline in the 1990s. Between 1999 and 2014, the county lost about 2,000 manufacturing jobs. The number of local farmers also declined. The county was heavily impacted by Hurricane Florence in 2018.

Geography

Columbus County is bordered by Bladen County, Pender County, Brunswick County, and Robeson County in North Carolina and Horry County and Dillon County in South Carolina. It is the third-largest county in North Carolina by land area. Columbus is drained by the Lumber River and Waccamaw River. There are several large lakes within the county, including Lake Tabor and Lake Waccamaw.

One of the most significant geographic features is the Green Swamp, a 15,907-acre area in the north-eastern portion of the county. Highway 211 passes alongside it. The swamp contains several unique and endangered species, such as the venus flytrap. The area contains the Brown Marsh Swamp, and has a remnant of the giant longleaf pine forest that once stretched across the Southeast from Virginia to Texas.

State and local protected areas 
 Green Swamp Preserve (part)
 Honey Hill Hunting Preserve
 Lake Waccamaw State Park
 Lumber River State Park (part)
 North Carolina Museum of Natural Sciences at Whiteville

Major water bodies 
 Cape Fear River
 Juniper Creek
 Lake Waccamaw
 Lumber River
 Waccamaw River
 White Marsh

Demographics

2020 census
As of the 2020 United States census, there were 50,623 people residing in the county. Unlike the 2010 census figures, the population of incarcerated persons were included in the 2020 figures. In proportions, the county was racially/ethnically 59.3 percent white, 28.6 percent black, 5.8 percent Hispanic, 3.4 percent American Indian, 0.3 percent Asian, 0.2 percent Pacific Islander, 3 percent two or more races, and 0.3 percent other. Compared to state averages, the county reported higher proportions of black and American Indian residents and lower proportions of white, Asian, and Hispanic residents. Whiteville is the largest municipality.

Demographic change

Between 2010 and 2020, Columbus County lost 7,475 residents, a population decline of 12.9 percent. The U.S. Census Bureau recorded declines in 12 of 14 reported communities. Census experts anticipate a further population decline between 2020 and 2030.

Government and politics

Government 
Columbus County is governed by a seven-member Board of Commissioners. The county is represented in the North Carolina Senate in district 8 and in the North Carolina House of Representatives in district 46. The county is a member of the regional Cape Fear Council of Governments, where it participates in area planning on a variety of issues.

Judicial system and law enforcement
Columbus County lies within the bounds of North Carolina's 15th Prosecutorial District, the 13A Superior Court District, and the 13th District Court District. The Columbus County Sheriff's Office provides law enforcement services for the county as well as operating the Columbus County Detention Center. There are two state prisons in the county, one at Tabor City, the Tabor City Correctional Institution, and one at Brunswick.

In 2022 Sheriff Jody Greene was re-elected to office after resigning a couple weeks prior due to allegations of obstructing justice and racism. District Attorney Jon David plans to file a new petition for his removal from office. Currently an investigation regarding him and The Columbus County Sheriff Office's actions is being carried out by North Carolina State Bureau of Investigation. He would late resign from office for the second time in January 2023.

Politics 

After the Reconstruction era, Columbus County's politics fell under the domination of the Democratic Party. Through much of the 20th century, local primaries were the preeminent political contests, marked by intense intraparty competition. General elections often displayed low turnout. Throughout much of the 2000s, the county electorate regularly supported Republican presidential candidates and Democratic local and state candidates. Following the election of Democrat Barack Obama as U.S. president in 2008, Republicans' performance in local races markedly improved. As of 2022, the county hosts about 36,200 registered voters, comprising about 15,344 registered Democrats, 10,100 registered Republicans and 10,700 unaffiliated. Despite Democrats' registration advantage, only one unopposed Democrat was elected to a county office in the 2022 local general elections.

Economy
The economy of Columbus County centers on agriculture and manufacturing. Columbus farmers produce crops such as pecans and peanuts, along with soybeans, potatoes, and corn. Cattle, poultry, and catfish are other agricultural products in the county. Factories in the region produce textiles, tools, and plywood. Household products such as doors, furniture, and windows are also manufactured in Columbus. The county hosts two industrial parks and shares a third with Brunswick County. International Paper is the largest employer. According to census figures, over 14,000 Columbus residents commute to other counties for work, while about 7,600 residents work within the county. The North Carolina Department of Commerce classifies the county as economically distressed and it has regularly suffered from a higher unemployment rate than the state average.

Transportation 
Airplane facilities are provided by the Columbus County Municipal Airport in Whiteville. The R.J. Corman Railroad Group operates a shortline railroad in the county.

Major highways

  (Concurrency with US 74/76)
 
 
 
 
  (Clarkton)
  (Tabor City)
  (Whiteville)

Education
Columbus is one of the few counties in North Carolina that has two public school systems: one for the county, which mostly serves rural areas, and one for the city of Whiteville. Both are led by elected school boards. The county government maintains a system of six libraries. The county also hosts Southeastern Community College. According to the 2021 American Community Survey, an estimated 14.1 percent of county residents have attained a bachelor's degree or higher level of education.

Healthcare 
Columbus County is served by a single hospital, Columbus Regional Healthcare System, based in Whiteville. According to the 2022 County Health Rankings produced by the University of Wisconsin Population Health Institute, Columbus County ranked 91st in health outcomes of North Carolina's 100 counties, an improvement over recent years, as it was ranked last from 2010 to 2015. Per the ranking, 26 percent of adults say they are in poor or fair health, the average life expectancy is 74 years, and 17 percent of people under the age of 65 lack health insurance. Columbus County has been heavily impacted by the opioid epidemic and led the state in opioid pills per person from 2006 to 2012 averaging 113.5 pills per person per year.

Communities

Cities

 Whiteville (named county seat in 1832 and the largest city)

Towns

 Boardman
 Bolton
 Brunswick
 Cerro Gordo
 Chadbourn
 Fair Bluff
 Lake Waccamaw
 Sandyfield
 Tabor City (Incorporated as a town 1904)

Townships

 Bogue
 Bolton
 Bug Hill
 Cerro Gordo
 Chadbourn
 Fair Bluff
 Lees
 Ransom
 South Williams
 Tatums
 Waccamaw
 Welch Creek
 Western Prong
 Williams
 Whiteville

Census-designated places
 Delco
 Evergreen, Tatums Township
 Hallsboro
 Riegelwood

Unincorporated areas
 Acme
 Cherry Grove
 Evergreen, Ransom Township
 Nakina
 Olyphic
 Pireway
 Riverview
 Sellerstown

See also
 List of counties in North Carolina
 National Register of Historic Places listings in Columbus County, North Carolina
 List of North Carolina state parks
 List of future Interstate Highways
 Waccamaw Siouan Indians, state-recognized tribe that resides in the county

References

Works cited

External links

 
 
 The News Reporter

 
1808 establishments in North Carolina
Populated places established in 1808